Rune Blomqvist (6 March 1925 – 22 October 2010) was a Swedish sprint canoeist who competed in the early 1950s. At the 1952 Summer Olympics in Helsinki, he finished eighth in the C-2 10000 m event while being eliminated in the heats of the C-2 1000 m event.

References
Rune Blomqvist's profile at Sports Reference.com
Rune Blomqvist's profile at the Swedish Olympic Committee

1925 births
2010 deaths
Canoeists at the 1952 Summer Olympics
Olympic canoeists of Sweden
Swedish male canoeists